Alexcars was a bus and coach operator based in Cirencester, UK.

History 
The firm was founded in 1946 by Alec and Barbara Hibberd and was originally located in Baunton. In the late 1950s, the firm moved to Cirencester where it remaiend until its closure.

On 14 April 2020, the company announced that it had ceased trading. The company said multiple factors, including the impact of the COVID-19 pandemic, led to the decision.

Livery 
The firm's vehicles had a two-tone blue livery.

References 

Former bus operators in England
1946 establishments in England
2020 disestablishments in England